The ETAP 23iL is a Belgian trailerable sailboat that was designed by Jacques de Ridder as a cruiser and first built in 1994.

Production
The design was built by ETAP Yachting in Belgium between 1994 and 1999, with 100 boats completed, but it is now out of production.

Design
The ETAP 23iL is a recreational keelboat, built predominantly of polyester glassfibre-foam sandwich construction, with wood trim. The use of foam sandwich construction makes the boat unsinkable. It has a 7/8 fractional sloop masthead sloop rig with aluminum spars, a deck-stepped mast, wire standing rigging and a single set of swept spreaders. The hull has a slightly raked stem, a plumb transom, a transom-hung rudder controlled by a tiller and a lifting keel with a weighted bulb. It displaces  and carries  of cast iron ballast.

The boat is normally fitted with a small  outboard motor for docking and manoeuvring.

The design has sleeping accommodation for four people, with a double "V"-berth in the bow cabin and two straight settees in the main cabin. The galley is located on the port side just aft of the bow cabin. The galley is equipped with a two-burner stove, an icebox and a sink. The head is located in the bow cabin on the port side, under the "V"-berth. The fresh water tank has a capacity of 

Operational history
The boat was at one time supported by a class club, the ETAP Owners Association.

A review in Boat Specs, notes "the Lifting keel version features an appendage configuration without compromise between draft and performance. Only drawback: some space is taken inside by the keel."

A review in the Yacht Charter Guide described the design, "the ETAP 23iL is a very safe, fast seagoing yacht with a long waterline. It can sail superbly close to the wind and, in the hands of an experienced crew, it handles easily even in the roughest conditions. This yacht features a regatta deck which allows every manoeuvre - even reefing - to be carried out from the cockpit. Below deck there's a comfortable, luxuriously finished and almost condensation-free cabin with ample stowage space and a very convenient navigation area with a chart table and instruments' panel. The lifting keel allows the ETAP 23iL to be trailered easily..."

See also
List of sailing boat types

References

External links

Keelboats
1990s sailboat type designs
Sailing yachts
Trailer sailers
Sailboat type designs by Jacques De Ridder
Sailboat types built by ETAP Yachting